São Vicente Island may refer to:

 São Vicente, Cape Verde
 São Vicente Island (São Paulo, Brazil)